There is a widespread claim that businesses benefit by having diversity in their work force . The business case for diversity stems from the progression of the models of diversity within the workplace since the 1960s. In the United States, the original model for diversity was situated around affirmative action drawing from equal opportunity employment objectives implemented in the Civil Rights Act of 1964. Equal employment opportunity was centered around the idea that any individual academically or physically qualified for a specific job could strive for (and possibly succeed) at obtaining the said job without being discriminated against based on identity. This compliance-based model gave rise to the idea that tokenism was the reason an individual was hired into a company when they differed from the dominant group. Dissatisfaction from minority groups eventually altered and/or raised the desire to achieve perfect employment opportunities in every job.

The social justice model evolved next and extended the idea that individuals outside the dominant group should be given opportunities within the workplace, not only because it was instituted as a law,  but because it was the right thing to do. Kevin Sullivan an ex-vice president of Apple Inc. said that "diversity initiatives must be sold as business, not social work." This model still revolved around the idea of tokenism, but it also brought in the notion of hiring based on a "good fit".

In the deficit model, it is believed that organizations that do not have a strong diversity inclusion culture will invite lower productivity, higher absenteeism, and higher turnover which will result in higher costs to the company. Establishments with more diversity are less likely to have successful unionization attempts.

Classification of workplaces

In a journal article entitled "The multicultural organization" by Taylor Cox Jr., Cox talks about three organization types that focus on the development of cultural diversity. The three types are: the monolithic organization, the plural organization, and the multicultural organization. In the monolithic organization, the amount of structural integration (the presence of persons from different cultural groups in a single organization) is minimal. This type of organization may have minority members within the workforce, but not in positions of leadership and power. Even though Diversity, Equity, and Inclusion are three interconnected concepts represented by the abbreviation DE&I, they are not interchangeable. Diversity without equity and inclusion is often perceived as "tokenism".

The plural organization has a more heterogeneous membership than the monolithic organization and takes steps to be more inclusive of persons from cultural backgrounds that differ from the dominant group. This type of organization seeks to empower those from a marginalized standpoint to encourage opportunities for promotion and positions of leadership.

The workplace diversity can be categorized into single-gender and mix genders. It focuses on mostly "identity-based differences among and between two or more people". The multicultural organization not only contains many different cultural groups or different genders, but it values this diversity. It encourages healthy conflict as a source of avoiding groupthink.

Benefits
Diversity is believed to bring substantial benefits such as better decision making and improved problem solving, greater creativity and innovation, which leads to enhanced product development, and more successful marketing to different types of customers. Diversity also enhances organizations' abilities to compete in global markets. Simply recognizing diversity in a corporation helps link the variety of talents within the organization. The act of recognizing diversity also allows for employees to feel have a sense of belonging, which increases their commitment to the company and allow each of them to contribute in a unique way. 

Standpoint theory suggests that marginalized groups bring a different perspective to an organization that challenges the status quo since their socially constructed world view will differ from that of the dominant group. Although the standpoint of the dominant group will often carry more weight, encouraging conflicting standpoints to coexist within an organization which will create a forum for sanctioned conflict to ensue. Standpoint theory gives a voice to those in a position to see patterns of behavior that those immersed in the culture have difficulty acknowledging. From this perspective, these unique and varying standpoints help to eradicate groupthink which can develop within a homogenous group.
Scott Page's (2007)
mathematical modeling research of team work reflects this view. His models demonstrated that heterogeneous teams consistently out-performed homogeneous teams on a variety of tasks.

Page points out, however, that diversity in teamwork is not always simple and that there are many challenges to fostering an inclusive environment in the workplace for diversity of thought and ideas. For example: "If we look at the evidence on whether identity diverse collections of people perform better than more homogeneous collections, we see mixed results at every level. At the country level, we find that in advanced economies, ethnic diversity proves beneficial. In poorer countries, it causes problems. In cities, we see similar effects. Diversity has the same pluses and minuses. Cognitive diversity increases innovation. Preference diversity leads to squabbles" (p. 14). Also, "We have no logical reason to think that identity diverse groups would perform better than more homogenous groups – unless we believe that mysterious collective cognitive capability emerges from the interactions of people with diverse identities" (p. 326).

Challenges
One of the greatest challenges an organization has when trying to adopt a more inclusive environment is assimilation for any member outside the dominant group. The interplay between power, ideology, and discursive acts which reinforce the hegemonic structure of organizations is the subject of much study. Everything from organizational symbols, rituals, and stories serve to maintain the position of power held by the dominant group.

When organizations hire or promote individuals that are not part of this dominant group into management positions, a tension develops between the socially constructed organizational norm and acceptance of cultural diversity. Some have claimed that cultural diversity in the workplace will increase interpersonal conflicts. Often these individuals are mentored and coached to adopt the necessary traits for inclusion into the privileged group as opposed to being embraced for their differences. According to the journal article "Cultural Diversity in the Workplace: The State of the Field", Marlene G. Fine explains that "those who assimilate are denied the ability to express their genuine selves in the workplace; they are forced to repress significant parts of their lives within a social context that frames a large part of their daily encounters with other people". Fine goes on to mention that "People who spend significant amounts of energy coping with an alien environment have less energy left to do their jobs. Assimilation does not just create a situation in which people who are different are likely to fail, it also decreases the productivity of organizations". That is, with a diverse workforce, management may have to work harder to reach the same level of productivity as with a less diverse workforce.

Another challenge faced by organizations striving to foster a more diverse workforce is the management of a diverse population. Managing diversity is more than simply acknowledging differences in people. A number of organizational theorists have suggested that work-teams which are highly diverse can be difficult to motivate and manage for a variety of reasons. A major challenge is miscommunication within an organization. Fine reported a study of "work groups that were culturally diverse and found that cross-cultural differences led to miscommunication". That is, a diverse workforce led to challenges for management. The meaning of a message can never be completely shared because no two individuals experience events in exactly the same way. Even when native and non-native speakers are exposed to the same messages, they may interpret the information differently. There are competencies, however, which help to develop effective communication in diverse organizational environments. These skills include self-monitoring, empathy, and strategic decision-making.

Maintaining a culture which supports the idea of employee voice (especially for marginalized group members) is another challenge for diverse organisation. When the organizational environment is not supportive of dissenting viewpoints, employees may choose to remain silent for fear of repercussions, or they may seek alternative safe avenues to express their concerns and frustrations such as on-line forums and affinity group meetings. By finding opportunities such as these to express dissent, individuals can begin to gather collective support and generate collective sense-making which creates a voice for the marginalized members so they can have a collective voice to trigger change.

Strategies to achieve diversity
Three approaches towards corporate diversity management can be distinguished: Liberal Change, Radical Change, and Transformational Change.

Liberal change
The liberal concept recognizes equality of opportunity in practice when all individuals are enabled freely and equally to compete for social rewards. The aim of the liberal change model is to have a fair labor market from which the best person is chosen for a job based solely on performance. To support this concept, a framework of formal rules has been created and policymakers are responsible for ensuring that these rules are enforced on all so none shall be discriminated against. The liberal-change approach centers on law, compliance, and legal penalties for non-compliance.

One weakness of the liberal view is that the formal rules cannot cover every aspect of work life, as there is almost always an informal aspect to work such as affinity groups, hidden transcripts, and alternative informal communication channels.

Radical changes
In contrast to the liberal approach, radical change seeks to intervene directly in the workplace practices in order to achieve balanced workforces, as well as a fair distribution of rewards among employees. The radical approach is thus more outcome focused than focused on the forming the rules to ensure equal treatment. One major tool of radical change is quotas which are set by companies or national institutions with the aim to regulate diversity of the workforce and equal opportunities.

Arguments for and against quota systems in companies or public institutions include contrasting ideas such as quotas
 compensating for actual barriers that prevent marginalized members from attaining their fair share of managerial positions
 being against equal opportunity for all and imply that a marginalized member only got the position to fill the quota. Sweden's quota system for parliamentary positions is a positive case for radical change through quota setting. 
A quota system was introduced at the Swedish parliament with the aim of ensuring that women constitute at least a ‘critical minority’ of 30 or 40 percent of all parliament seats. Since the introduction of the system, women representation in parliament has risen dramatically even above the defined quota. Today, 47% of parliamentary representatives are women, a number which stands out compared to the global average of 19%.

Transformational change
Transformational change covers an equal opportunity agenda for both the immediate need as well as long-term solutions. For the short term it implements new measures to minimize bias in procedures such as recruitment, promotion, and communication. The long term, however, is seen as a project of transformation for organizations. This approach acknowledges the existence of power systems and seeks to challenge the existing hegemony through implementation of equality values.

One illustrative case for transformational change is ageing management; Younger employees are seen as more innovative and flexible, while older employees are associated with higher costs of salary, benefits, and healthcare needs. Therefore, companies may prefer young workers to older staff. Through application of the transformational concept an immediate intervention provides needed relief while a longer-term culture shift occurs.

For the short-term, an organization can set up legislation preventing discrimination based on age (e.g., Age Discrimination in Employment Act). However, for the long-term solution, negative stereotypes of older employees needs to be replaced with the positive realization that older employees can add value to the workplace through their experience and knowledge base. To balance this idea with the benefit of innovation and flexibility that comes with youth, a mixture of ages in the workforce is ideal. Through transformational change, the short-term solution affords the organization the time necessary to enact deep rooted culture changes leading to a more inclusive environment.

Movements 
In 2017, PwC's U.S. chairman, Tim Ryan, amassed more than 175 c-suite executives (some belonging to the Fortune 500) to sign their CEO Action for Diversity & Inclusion™ pledge. The pledge is a business commitment to advance diversity in the workplace and is made by executives from notable companies such as Walmart, Staples, Dow Chemical, Cisco and Morgan Stanley. As of 2021, more than 2,000 CEOs have signed the pledge including James Murdoch, Tom Buttgenbach, Jeanne Crain, M. Patrick Carroll, James C. Foster and Wayne A.I. Frederic.

Implementation 

Intentional "diversity programs" can assist organizations facing rapid demographic changes in their local consumer market and labor pool by helping people work and understand one another better.

Diversity inclusion initiatives must start with the commitment from the top. With a commitment from top leaders in an organization to change the existing culture to one of diversity inclusion, the diversity change management process can succeed. This process includes analyzing where the organization is currently at through a diversity audit, creating a strategic action plan, gaining support by seeking stakeholder input, and holding individuals accountable through measurable results.

See also 

 Affirmative action
 Ageism
 Diversity (politics)
 Diversity, equity, and inclusion
 Ethnic penalty
 Functional diversity (organizational)
 Reverse discrimination
 Team composition
 Women in the workforce
 Stigma management

References 

Affirmative action
Multiculturalism
Identity politics
Corporate social responsibility
Diversity (business)
Workplace